The Days to Come is a 2019 Spanish drama film directed by Carlos Marqués-Marcet. The film is about the emotions of a couple during pregnancy and stars real-life expectant couple Maria Rodriguez and David Verdaguer.

The film was produced by Lastor Media and Avalon PC, with the participation of Movistar+, TVE, and TVC and support from ICAA and ICEC.

Distributed by Avalon, the film was theatrically released in Spain on 28 June 2019.

See also 
 List of Spanish films of 2019

References

External links 
 
 

Spanish drama films
2019 drama films
2019 films
Avalon films
Films directed by Carlos Marques-Marcet
2010s Catalan-language films
2010s Spanish films